Predgriže is a settlement northeast of Črni Vrh in the Municipality of Idrija in the traditional Inner Carniola region of Slovenia. The village includes the hamlets of Gornje Griže, Klavžar, Nagode, Na Vrhu, Smrekar, Spodnje Griže, and Žgavec.

Mass grave
Predgriže is the site of a mass grave associated with the Second World War. It contains the remains of unidentified victims.

References

External links
Predgriže on Geopedia

Populated places in the Municipality of Idrija